Rajakhera is a city and a municipality in Dholpur district in the Indian state of Rajasthan.

Geography
It has an average elevation of 153 metres (505 feet).

Rajakhera is on the border of Rajasthan state. It is about 36 km from Agra Uttar Pradesh and about the same distance from Dholpur. Shamsabad, Agra is the nearest town on Uttar Pradesh border between Agra and Rajakhera. Utangan River flows between Shamshabad and Rajakhera and forms the border of Rajasthan and Uttar Pradesh. The bridge on this river was constructed in 1964 which allowed easy commute to Agra and other major cities.

Demographics
 India census, Rajakhera had a population of 28,339. Males constitute 54% of the population and females 46%. Rajakhera has an average literacy rate of 75%, higher than the national average of 67.6%: male literacy is 84%, and female literacy is 66%. In Rajakhera, 19% of the population is under 5 years of age. In the region Chambal, the only river is known for fresh water dolphin and crocodile sanctuary.

Transport 
The only mode of transport to Rajakhera is by road. The closest railway stations are Agra and Dholpur . Both are 36 km from Rajakhera. Rajasthan government buses run between Agra and Rajakhara. A bus from Rajakhera to Agra and Rajakhera to Dholpur every half-hour. Rajakhera is not connected with any railway line. The inter state transport is from Rajakhera to Pinahat. The Pinahat (formerly known as Shreenagar) is a town in the Agra district, Uttar Pradesh India.

Political and current affairs
Mr.Rohit Kumar Singh alias of the Indian National Congress Party won the 2018 election for Member of the Legislative Assembly (MLA) from Rajakhera constituency. Despite being a Dacoity infected region in the Chambal ravines, Rajakhera is being illuminated by some iconic personalities like Dr. D. P. Sharma, a Digital Diplomat, world-renowned IT scientist serving to ILO of the United Nations and Prime Minister's National Ambassador for Swachh Bharat Mission, Pavan Kumar Jain (IPS), Director General of Homeguards and Disaster Management, Madhya Pradesh, and well-known poet of Hindi, Dushyant Mudgal, IPoS, Director, Indian Postal Service, Alok Kumar Sharma, IRS, Dr. Brij Bihari Sharma, Scientist at Indian Agricultural Research Institute, Pusa campus New Delhi ( ICAR, Govt of India) Narayan Mudgal Assistant Scientist & Mr.Pankaj Kumar manager in BCPL Delhi  Hariom Shaurya, RAS(Allied Service), Manish Shaurya, IPS,  Dataram, RAS can be counted as few names who have achieved a feat beyond the circumstances backwardness and unlike looked Area. So far, the average development of this area which should have been according to the average growth rate of Rajasthan state has not happened. And this is the reason that this area is still known for Bandit Activities. Agra is a tourist center in India, which is only 36 kilometers away from Rajakhera. From another important point of view, the Fresh Water Dolphins are found in the Chambal area near Rajakhera and can be developed as a tourist place. But so far this area has been incomplete in terms of development in this context. Mr Anil Parashar assistant commissioner of GST Rajasthan.

References

Cities and towns in Dholpur district